Sir Guy Standing, KBE (1 September 1873 – 24 February 1937) was an English actor.

Biography 
Standing served in the Royal Naval Volunteer Reserve throughout the First World War, reaching the rank of commander. He was seconded to MI6, but transferred to the Ministry of Information in December 1917. In 1918, he was part of the British War Mission to the United States. For this service, he was made a Commander of the Order of the British Empire (CBE) in 1918 and raised to Knight Commander (KBE) in the 1919 New Year Honours. 

After becoming a noted actor in British and American theatre, he moved to Hollywood in the early 1930s appearing in Paramount films. His best-known role is probably that of Colonel Stone, autocratic father of Lieutenant Stone (played by Richard Cromwell), in Henry Hathaway's Lives of a Bengal Lancer (1935).

He was the son of Herbert Standing (1846–1923), a noted actor from the stage and in silent films. His brothers Jack Standing, Herbert Standing Jr., Percy Standing and Wyndham Standing were also actors, as was his first wife Isabelle Urquhart, and his third wife and mother of his three children, Dorothy Hammond (née Plaskitt), his son Guy Standing Jr. and his daughter, Kay Hammond (née Dorothy Katherine Standing) and grandson John Standing.

His son Michael Standing (died 1 December 1984), was the first live BBC cricket commentator and live radio commentator, known particularly for his "Standing on the Corner" slot in In Town Tonight. After a distinguished war record as Head of Outside Broadcasting, he went on to become Director of Variety. In this role he was responsible for commissioning such classics as The Goon Show, The Navy Lark, Hancock's Half Hour and Round the Horne. His later roles in radio management included the negotiation with the Musicians' Union to provide sufficient airtime for both recorded artists and live orchestras. The agreement he made enabled the start of Radio 1. Michael also wrote The Green Book, a book of rules and principles put into practice by the BBC of Lord Reith.

Death 
Standing died from a heart attack on 24 February 1937. He was picking up his car from a garage when the attendant asked him how he felt. "Excellent," he replied, "In fact, I never felt better in my life." Standing then fell to the floor, writhing in pain and clutching his chest. He died at Hollywood Emergency Hospital a few minutes later, never having spoken another word. He was interred at Grand View Memorial Park Cemetery in Glendale, California. Rumours surrounding Standing's death suggested that he had died from the complications of either a black widow spider or rattlesnake bite, but this has been deemed false.

Filmography

References

External links 

1873 births
1937 deaths
English male film actors
English male stage actors
Male actors from London
Knights Commander of the Order of the British Empire
Actors awarded knighthoods
Royal Navy officers
Royal Naval Volunteer Reserve personnel of World War I
20th-century English male actors
Artists' Rifles soldiers
Standing family
Burials at Grand View Memorial Park Cemetery